The 1969–70 season was Colchester United's 28th season in their history and their second successive season in the fourth tier of English football, the Fourth Division. Alongside competing in the Fourth Division, the club also participated in the FA Cup and the League Cup.

Colchester ended an injury blighted season in tenth position in the Fourth Division, while they were knocked out in the first round of the FA Cup by Newport County, and in the second round of the League Cup by neighbours and rivals Ipswich Town in their heaviest defeat of the campaign.

Season overview
For the new season, manager Dick Graham employed a new policy of recruiting older, more experienced players. He said:

He brought in Bobby Cram, formerly of West Bromwich Albion and hitherto playing in Canada, to become his captain for the season, while also paying £5,000 for Ken Jones from Millwall.

An eleven-game unbeaten home run gave Colchester a chance for a promotion push, but an expanding injury list held back the U's progress. Trainer Dennis Mochan made a final appearance for the club during the campaign having taking up a coaching position at the end of the previous season. The club finished in tenth place, while exiting both Cups in the early rounds; a defeat to Newport County in the first round of the FA Cup, and a second round defeat to Ipswich Town in the League Cup.

Players

Transfers

In

 Total spending:  ~ £10,000

Out

 Total incoming:  ~ £10,000

Loans in

Match details

Fourth Division

Results round by round

League table

Matches

League Cup

FA Cup

Squad statistics

Appearances and goals

|-
!colspan="14"|Players who appeared for Colchester who left during the season

|}

Goalscorers

Disciplinary record

Clean sheets
Number of games goalkeepers kept a clean sheet.

Player debuts
Players making their first-team Colchester United debut in a fully competitive match.

See also
List of Colchester United F.C. seasons

References

General
Books

Websites

Specific

1969-70
English football clubs 1969–70 season